Mi ex me tiene ganas (English title: My Ex Wants Me) is a Venezuelan telenovela written by Martín Hahn and produced by Venevisión in 2012.

Daniela Alvarado and Luciano D'Alessandro star as the protagonists with Norkys Batista, Lilibeth Morillo, Winston Vallenilla and Jonathan Montenegro starring as co-protagonists while Guillermo Garcia, Carlos Montilla, Miguel Ferrari and Eileen Abad as antagonists.

On May 16, 2012, Venevisión started broadcasting Mi ex me tiene ganas weeknights at 9:00 pm, replacing El árbol de Gabriel. The last episode was broadcast on December 5, 2012. Production of Mi ex me tiene ganas began on February 9, 2012 in Caracas. Promos began airing on Venevisión from April 8, 2012. The theme song of the telenovela Amor de mis amores is written and sung by co-star Lilibeth Morillo.

The premiere episode in Venezuela obtained an audience share of 52%.

Plot
Pilar, Soledad and Miranda are three friends whose lives are about to change when they happen to meet their ex-boyfriends.

Pilar meets Alonso Prada, her former boyfriend who abandoned her years ago and he is now a successful professional. Miranda is a model that meets her former husband. She is now married to the billionaire Kevin Miller, Miranda yearns for a child, but her husband, who already has 2 daughters from a previous marriage, does not want any more children. Therefore, she toys with the idea of her ex-husband Spartacus fathering her desired baby. Soledad is a divorced woman and make-up artist who still lives with her ex-husband so that she can be able to provide for her two daughters. She finally sees an opportunity of happiness when she meets her former lover Pablo Naranjo who has become a male underwear model.

These three women, who have encountered men who made them unhappy in the past, now see new chances of happiness. However, the strange disappearance of socialite Antonia Paris leads to the appearance of a mysterious serial killer referred to as Los Brujos Assessinos who creates the mystery plot of the story. Furthermore, Pilar's chances of happiness with Alonso are hindered by his wife Karen Miller who is extremely jealous and is not willing to give Alonso a divorce. While they continue investigating the mystery surrounding the serial killer, the events change the course of their lives.

Cast

Main 
 Daniela Alvarado as Pilar La Roca
 Luciano D'Alessandro as Alonso Prada
 Guillermo García as Cornelio Mena
 Norkys Batista as Miranda Atenas de Miller
 Carlos Montilla as Kevin Miller
 Winston Vallenilla as Espartaco Sansegundo
 Lilibeth Morillo as Soledad Linares de Cordero
 Miguel Ferrari as Jaime Cordero
 Jonathan Montenegro as Pablo Naranjo
 Eileen Abad as Karen Miller Holt de Prada

Secondary 

 Amanda Gutiérrez as Dolores de La Roca
 Caridad Canelón as Felipa Franco
 Crisol Carabal as Amanda Atenas
 Hilda Abrahamz as Lucrecia Holt de Miller
 Gustavo Rodríguez as Valentin La Roca
 Rolando Padilla as Bautista Zorrilla
 Carolina Perpetuo as Antonia Paris
 Miguel de León as Franco Rosas 
 Mariaca Semprún as Talía Flores
 Sheryl Rubio as Stefany Miller Holt 
 Susej Vera as Rebeca Patiño
 Kerly Ruíz as Kristel Manzano
 Martin Brassesco as Gustavo Rivas
 Gabriel López as Germán Zorrilla Franco
 Saúl Marín as Jesús Muñoz
 Martha Track  as Dorís Espino
 César Flores as Antonio Torres
 Andreína Carvó as Alessandra Morales
 Carla García as Helena Cordero Linares
 Meisbel Rangel as Andrea Prada La Roca
 Bárbara Díaz as Georgina Cordero Linares
 Carlos Dos Santos as Enrique Prada Miller "Kike"
 Juan Diego Bracho as Ángel Sansegundo Patiño "Angelito"
 Esther Orjuela as Zoraida Ortiz
 Juan Carlos García as Bruno Lincuestenin
 Rosalinda Serfaty as Claudia
 Javier Paredes as Alirio Lobo
 Gonzalo Cubero as Shaman
 Alejo Felipe as Lorenzo Estrada
 Flor Elena González as Margot Londoño
 Marisol Matheus as Esposa de Lorenzo Estrada
 María Fernanda Pita as Valery Estrada
 Luis Perdomo as Himself
 Eulalia Siso as Emma Colorado
 Daniel Rodriguez as Dr. Almeida
 Alexander Montilla as Abogado Siso
 Gustavo Silva as Francisco Hernandez
 Antonio Delli as Detective Jose Ernesto Navas
 Paula Woyzechowsky as Verónica Álvarado
 Ivette Dominguez as Vicky Aurora Patiño
 Dolores Heredia as Margarita Lobo
 Margarita Hernández as Carlota Naranjo
 Dora Mazzone as Petra Paris

Soundtrack

Track listing

References

External links

Official Site 

2012 telenovelas
Venevisión telenovelas
Venezuelan telenovelas
Spanish-language telenovelas
2012 Venezuelan television series debuts
2012 Venezuelan television series endings
Television shows set in Caracas